Originally released in 1984, Play Dead's "Resurrection" is an eclectic album compared to their other releases. It ranges from synth-based tracks like "Conspiracy" to non-synth like "Pale Fire" and "Sacrosanct."

The first release of "Resurrection" was "From the Promised Land". When "From the Promised Land" was originally released in May 1984, Play Dead decided they were dissatisfied with the recordings. At this time, only 1,000 copies of the original LP were pressed and released. The band remixed the eight tracks on the album. It was rereleased shortly and every copy of the album that featured the new mixes had the sticker "Remix" attached to the front cover. This was the second release of "From the Promised Land." The third edition was retitled "Resurrection" and featured eight new tracks. The song "Weeping Blood" was not included on the third edition, though it was available on the first two editions, as well as the 2007 reissue.

Track listing
All songs written by Play Dead.

"Break" – 3:45
"Isabel (remix)" – 4:53
"Walk Away (remix)" – 3:43
"Bloodstains" – 4:08
"Solace (remix)" – 5:39
"No Motive (remix)" – 4:25
"Pleasureland (remix)" – 5:27
"Pale Fire" – 3:56
"Sacrosanct" – 3:43
"Torn on Desire (remix)" – 4:30
"Holy Holy" – 4:10
"Return to the East (remix)" – 4:09
"Conspiracy" – 4:32
"Sin of Sins (live 1985)" – 4:27
"Bloodstain Pleasure (12" mix)" – 5:13
"Solace (12" mix)" – 5:40
"Holy Holy (catholic mix)" – 6:13

Personnel
Rob Hickson - vocals
Pete Waddleton - bass
Steve Green - guitar
Mark "Wiff" Smith - drums

Play Dead (band) albums
1992 albums
Albums produced by John Fryer (producer)